Spencer Nakacwa (born 1998 or 1999) is a Ugandan footballer who plays as a forward for FUFA Women Super League club Lady Doves FC and the Uganda women's national team.

Club career
Nakacwa has played for Lady Doves in Uganda.

International career
Nakacwa capped for Uganda at senior level during the 2021 COSAFA Women's Championship.

References

External links

1990s births
Living people
Ugandan women's footballers
Women's association football forwards
Uganda women's international footballers